The KTM 1290 Super Duke R is a 1301 cc 75° V-twin engine, naked motorcycle from the Austrian manufacturer KTM. With the update in 2017 the motor is the most powerful LC8 engine ever built by KTM.

Design 
The KTM 1290 Super Duke R is a naked bike. The 2014–2016 models suspension was considered to be too soft but the 2017 update has addressed this with stiffer springs. The 2016 model had compression ratio of 13.2:1 and 2017 model has increased compression ratio to 13.6:1. The 2017 model comes with Cruise control as standard and has upgraded electronics such as lean angle sensitive traction control, ride by wire, and optional track mode along with previous model's  cornering ABS, quickshifter, riding modes etc.

Performance 
For 2014 model, it had acceleration of 0–60 mph in 2.6 seconds, 0–124 mph in 7.2 seconds, braking distance of 99.1 feet from 60–0 mph with ABS, and 138.5 feet from 60–0 mph without ABS. The 2014 model produces maximum of 180 hp  and 106 lb-ft of torque.

For the 2017 year model update, the engine and throttle response have become smoother and now produces 177 hp.

Rivals 
The KTM 1290 Super Duke commonly rivals Suzuki B-King, EBR 1190SX, BMW S1000R,Triumph Speed Triple R, Yamaha MT-10, Ducati Monster 1200S/R, Ducati Streetfighter S, and Aprilia Tuono.

References

See also
List of motorcycles by type of engine
BMW S1000R
Aprilia Tuono

External links

Motorcycles introduced in 2013
KTM motorcycles